Pascale Ehrenfreund (born 1960) is an Austrian astrophysicist. Ehrenfreund holds degrees from the University of Vienna (Masters, molecular biology; PhD astrophysics, habilitation, astrochemistry) and Webster Leiden (Masters, management and leadership). Prior to becoming a Research Professor of Space Policy and International Affairs at George Washington University, she was a professor at Radboud University Nijmegen, Leiden University, and University of Amsterdam in the Netherlands. She was the first woman president of the Austrian Science Fund (FWF) and from 2015-2020, she was the CEO of the German Aerospace Center. Since 2019, she is the President of the International Astronautical Federation (IAF) and since 2018, she is the Chancellor of the International Space University (ISU). Since 2021 she is president of the ISU. The main-belt asteroid 9826 Ehrenfreund is named in her honor. She is the President of Committee on Space Research from 2022 to 2026.

Biography
Pascale Ehrenfreund was born in Vienna, Austria, in 1960. She began her university studies at the University of Vienna, where she studied astronomy and biology. She went on to earn a degree in molecular biology at the Institute of Molecular Biology, Salzburg (Austrian Academy of Sciences) in 1988 and then completed her doctorate in astrophysics at the University of Paris VII and the University of Vienna in 1990. Her post-doctorate studies were conducted at the Leiden Observatory as a Fellow of the European Space Agency ESA and later at the Service d'Aeronomie, Verrières-le-Buisson, France, as a Fellow of the French space agency Centre national d'études spatiales (CNES). In 1993, she received the Marie Curie Fellowship by the European Commission. In 1996, she accepted the APART scholarship from the Austrian Academy of Sciences, to prepare her research in astrochemistry for her habilitation Thesis at the University of Vienna. She earned her Habilitation degree on the topic of "Cosmic Dust" in 1999 and in 2008 went on to earn a master's degree in Management and Leadership from Webster University in Leiden, Netherlands.

Beginning in 1999, she worked at the Leiden Observatory and was a professor at both the University of Amsterdam and Leiden University in the Netherlands. She was also a professor at Radboud University Nijmegen, in the Netherlands. In 2001, she became the head of the Astrobiology Laboratory at Leiden and participated as the teamleader, co-investigator and principal investigator in numerous experiments and space missions sponsored by both ESA and NASA. In 2005, Pascale Ehrenfreund came to the United States to work at the Jet Propulsion Laboratory in Pasadena, California as distinguished Visiting Scientist. In 2008, she accepted a position as a research professor and policy expert at the Space Policy Institute of George Washington University (GWU) in Washington, D.C. and as a senior scientist at the NASA Astrobiology Institute. From 2008 - 2012 she was the project scientist of NASA's O/OREOS satellite. Pascale Ehrenfreund has written over 300 scientific research papers, holds an H-index of 70 and published 12 books.

In 2013, she was selected as the first woman to head the Austrian Science Fund (FWF).

From 2015-2020, she was the first woman to lead the German Aerospace Center (DLR).

The main-belt asteroid, 9826 Ehrenfreund was named in her honor.

Awards
 2018 Honorary Fellow of the Royal Astronomical Society
 2011 NASA Group Achievement Award for the O/OREOS satellite mission
 2001 Pastoor-Schmeits Prize for Astronomy
 2001 New Impulse Grand, Dutch Government
 1999 Asteroid 9826 Ehrenfreund 2114 T-3
 1996 APART Prize, Austrian Academy of Science

Active Memberships in Academies and Committees 
 2019- President, International Astronautical Federation
 2016-2019 Vice President, International Astronautical Federation
 2016- Vice Chancellor, International Space University
 2015- Vice President, Helmholtz Association (Aeronautics-Space-Transportation)
 2015- Board of Trustees, University Space Research Association USRA, Region III

See also
 List of minor planets named after people

References

Bibliography

External links 
 
 WordCat Publications
 NASA publications list

Astrobiologists
Austrian non-fiction writers
Science writers
Living people
1960 births
Austrian women scientists
Austrian women writers
Women astronomers
Women science writers
University of Vienna alumni
Webster University alumni
University of Paris alumni
George Washington University faculty
Academic staff of Radboud University Nijmegen
Academic staff of Leiden University
Academic staff of the University of Amsterdam
Scientists from Vienna
20th-century Austrian astronomers
21st-century Austrian astronomers
20th-century Austrian writers
21st-century Austrian writers
20th-century non-fiction writers
21st-century non-fiction writers
20th-century women scientists
21st-century women scientists
Austrian expatriates in France
Austrian expatriates in the United States
Austrian expatriates in the Netherlands